The 2021 Slough Borough Council election took place on 6 May 2021 to elect members of Slough Borough Council in England. This was on the same day as other local elections.

Results summary

Ward results

Baylis and Stoke

Britwell and Northborough

Central

Chalvey

Cippenham Green

Cippenham Meadows

Elliman

Farnham

Foxborough

Haymill and Lynch Hill

Langley Kedermister

Langley St. Mary's

Upton

Wexham Lea

References

2021
Slough